Skene Bay is an Arctic waterway in Qikiqtaaluk Region, Nunavut, Canada. Located off southern Melville Island, the bay is an arm of Viscount Melville Sound.

It is named after Lieut. Edward Monte Skene who served on Arctic expeditions with Sir John Ross in 1818, and with Sir William Edward Parry in 1819.

References

Bays of Qikiqtaaluk Region